Grantham North Services is a service area operated by Moto located on the A1 at Gonerby Moor Roundabout, four miles north of Grantham in Lincolnshire, England. The service station has a main car park and coach/lorry park, off which is a BP petrol station.

It lies in the parish of Great Gonerby, south of College Farm. It is the only motorway service station in Lincolnshire, which has no motorways (excluding North Lincolnshire and North East Lincolnshire). Very few people refer to it as Grantham North, and is ubiquitously known as the Gonerby Moor Service Area.

History

Tony's Cafe
Tony's cafe cost £120,000 in 1963, and opened on Wednesday 1 January 1964. On the new Gonerby site would be a transport cafe, and a restaurant for the lounge suit and cardigan crowd, as the two groups of people, if using the same restaurant, would just make one another uncomfortable. The new plans for the 13 acre site included a motel; Tony Wakley had toured the US, to look at motels. He wanted to build a transport cafe to be more like a workers canteen.

The two owners were Anthony George Wakley (22 January 1921 - 15 September 1997) and Phillip Edward Wakley. From around 1952, their previous site was known as Tony's Place; this former site served around 2,000 to 3,000 meals a day.

Phillip married Ethel Haddock at St Botolph's Church, Boston on 31 July 1943, with Tony being best man; Phillip (3 October 1920 - 18 August 1982) also worked at BMARC; before the war, Phillip had worked as a joiner in Gainsborough, Lincolnshire.

Tony married on Monday 27 December 1943 to Phyllis Dawson, of the Seacroft Hotel of Drummond Road in Skegness, when Tony was a Corporal in the RAF, at St Matthew's church in Skegness. His parents lived on Oakleigh Road, off Dysart Road, in Grantham, but he grew up in Stickford.
Both brothers were scouts in the 1st Stickford Group. Tony also owned Westgate Fisheries in Grantham, which opened on 10 February 1948. Bad weather and Blue Lias clay held up bypass in 1961.

His mother, Alice, ran the cafe at night. Ministry of Transport figures found that around 30% of HGVs on the A1 stopped at Tony's Cafe; Tony's Cafe was almost as well known on the A1 as Watford Gap services was on the M1. In 1964 a breakfast at Tony's Cafe could cost 2s 3d, which was good value. The cafe was discussed in the House of Commons on 17 February 1964 at around 10pm, with Farthing Corner and Newport Pagnell. The service area had many half pint mugs go missing, as souvenirs, in 1967.

Trust House Forte
The site was owned by Trust House Forte in the 1980s and 1990s, under their Welcome Break group.

Forte opened the redeveloped site in early 1972 as Grantham Service Area. The Little Chef opened in September 1980; the Little Chef closed in 2008. The Granary Self Service opened in 1984, being open 24 hours, and seated 162. In 1985 the site served 2.5m people. It was known as Motor Chef in the 1980s; Motor Chef was started by THF in 1974; by 1979, there were 14 Motor Chefs across the country.

In the early 1970s, the site had a RAC service centre, with a transmitter on Gonerby Hill, and microwave direct link to Copt Oak, on the M1.

Redevelopment
The service area was much redeveloped in January 1986, to largely what it now is. It became Welcome Break from about 1990, being Granada Hospitality by 1996. The site was known as Grantham North from 1998, or thereabouts.

Transport
The service station is now accessed via a grade separated junction on the A1 after the original Gonerby Moor roundabout was improved during 2008.

The Grantham South services (opened on Tuesday 5 September 1989) are at Colsterworth, also owned by Moto, and included a Little Chef.

References

External links 
 Moto Official Site - Grantham North
 Motorway Services Online - Grantham North
 Motorway Services

1964 establishments in England
A1 road (Great Britain)
Buildings and structures in Lincolnshire
Commercial buildings completed in 1964
Grantham
Moto motorway service stations